Suslaidy Girat Rivero (born 19 August 1987) is a Cuban female deaf track and field athlete. She has competed at the Deaflympics in 2009, 2013 and in 2017 representing Cuba. Suslaidy Girat has won 8 medals in the Deaflympics including 6 gold medals and set the landmark for becoming the finest ever Cuban to have competed at the Deaflympics.

In the 2013 Summer Deaflympics, she broke the world record in the 100m individual competition for the deaf (women) with a timing of 11.71 seconds.

She also holds some unique records in Deaflympics for women in athletics such as 100m (11.71 seconds), long jump (6.13 seconds), triple jump (13.60 seconds).

References 

1987 births
Living people
Cuban female athletes
Cuban female sprinters
Cuban female long jumpers
Cuban female triple jumpers
Deaf competitors in athletics
Cuban deaf people
21st-century Cuban women